is a subway station on the Tokyo Metro Marunouchi Line in Nakano, Tokyo, Japan, operated by the Tokyo subway operator Tokyo Metro.

Lines
The station is numbered "Mb-04".

Station layout
The station has two side platforms serving two tracks on the first basement (B1F) level. The single entrance, ticket vending machines, and ticket barriers are located at ground level.

Platforms

History
Nakano-fujimicho Station opened on 8 February 1961.

The station facilities were inherited by Tokyo Metro after the privatization of the Teito Rapid Transit Authority (TRTA) in 2004.

In March 2010, to promote the release of the Cho-Den-O Trilogy of the Kamen Rider movies, a special marking was used on the trains coming to Nakano-fujimichō from Ueno Station, and Den-O's Rina Akiyama greeted 200 fans who rode on the first of those trains.

Passenger statistics
In fiscal 2013, the station was the least used on the Marunouchi Line and the 125th-busiest on the Tokyo Metro network with an average of 18,285 passengers daily.

The passenger statistics for previous years are as shown below.

Surrounding area
 Tokyo Metro Nakano Maintenance Depot, south of the station
 Tokyo Metro Training Center
 Kosei Hospital
 Fuji High School & Fuji Junior High School
 Nakano No. 2 Junior High School
 Nakano Hongo Elementary School
 Kanda River

References

External links

 Nakano-fujimicho Station information (Tokyo Metro) 

Stations of Tokyo Metro
Tokyo Metro Marunouchi Line
Railway stations in Tokyo
Railway stations in Japan opened in 1961